John Kelt Edwards (4 March 1875 – 11 October 1934) was a Welsh artist and cartoonist. The son of a shopkeeper from Blaenau Ffestiniog, Edwards was educated at Llandovery College. After leaving college he toured Europe, and exhibited his artwork at the Paris Salon.

Notable for his portraits of famous Welsh individuals, his works included paintings of David Lloyd George and Owen Morgan Edwards. He was also known for designs connected to the military, he designed the badge and banner for the Comrades of the Great War and the roll of honour of the Royal Welch Fusiliers. He also contributed book illustrations and produced war cartoons. He died at Ceinewydd and was buried at Blaenau Ffestiniog.

References

External links
 John Kelt Edwards letters at the National Library of Wales

1875 births
1934 deaths
People from Blaenau Ffestiniog
Welsh artists
Welsh cartoonists